Judas and the Black Messiah is the soundtrack to the identically named 2021 biographical crime-drama film. Two soundtracks — Judas and the Black Messiah (Original Motion Picture Soundtrack), consisting of film score composed by Mark Isham and Craig Harris, and Judas and the Black Messiah: The Inspired Album, consisting of incorporated film songs, were released by WaterTower Music and RCA Records on February 12, 2021, the same day as the film's theatrical and premium video-on-demand release on HBO Max. The soundtrack and score received positive critical acclaim. The original song "Fight for You", which was featured in the film score album, won the Academy Award for Best Original Song at the 93rd Academy Awards.

Judas and the Black Messiah (Original Motion Picture Soundtrack) 

The film's score was composed by Mark Isham and Craig Harris. It features an original song titled "Fight for You" performed by H.E.R., who also co-wrote it with D'Mile and Tiara Thomas. The Inflated Tear is a Roland Kirk track from 1968.

Judas and the Black Messiah: The Inspired Album 

An accompanying 22-track music album titled Judas and the Black Messiah: The Inspired Album came out on the day of the film's digital release, with songs from many prominent rappers, such as Jay-Z, ASAP Rocky and Nas, as well as a posthumous appearance by Nipsey Hussle. The Inspired Album, was later released through double vinyl by Waxwork Records on April 2, 2021.

Reception 

From the critical reviews for the soundtrack, Metacritic assigned a score of 70/100. Clash, gave 9/10 to the soundtrack, stating a verdict: "An emphatic show of force that frequently taps into outright brilliance. As an album it's not without fault, but as a cultural event it's largely without peer." HiphopDX gave a mixed review saying "The Inspired Album could’ve benefited from more carefully curated content instead of some of the tone-deaf material that wound up on the project". Pitchfork stated "It’s hard to believe that the bulk of the project was inspired by anything that Hampton said. Instead, it exploits his image to peddle liberation-lite Billboard hits over anything remotely revolutionary. It’s not all terrible."

Chart performance

Weekly charts

Year-end charts

Accolades

References

External links 

 
 

2021 soundtrack albums
RCA Records albums
WaterTower Music soundtracks
Mark Isham soundtracks
Craig Harris albums
Pop soundtracks